Wiels is a contemporary art centre situated in Forest, in the Brussels Capital Region, Belgium in a former brewery. The centre opened in 2007. Wiels has no collection, instead putting on temporary exhibitions by national and international artists.

Wiels hosts nine artist-in-residency studios, for which it receives hundreds of applications every year. 

For its tenth anniversary in 2017, Wiels organized a group exhibition called The Absent Museum, a reference to the incorrect assumption that Wiels is an art museum.

Building history

In 1931, the Wielemans-Ceuppens built the Blomme building (named after its architect ) to expand its brewing business. At the time, it was the largest brewhouse in continental Europe. In 1988, the brewery closed, and in 1993, the building was given protected status, saving it from demolition. In 2001, the Brussels Capital region acquired the building and began renovating it to open Wiels. The name Wiels was derived from Wielemans-Ceuppens. It is one of the few examples of modernist industrial architecture in Belgium.

References

External links
 

Culture in Brussels
Museums in Brussels
Forest, Belgium
Art museums established in 2007